Parancistrus nudiventris is a species of armored catfish endemic to Brazil where it occurs in the Xingu River.  This species grows to a length of  SL.

References
 

Ancistrini
Fish of South America
Fish of Brazil
Endemic fauna of Brazil
Fish described in 2005